American hop latent virus (AHLV) is a plant pathogenic virus of the family Betaflexiviridae. Its genome is about 8,600 nucleotides in length with a 3'-polyadenylate tail that contains a total of six open reading frames.

References

External links
ICTVdB - The Universal Virus Database: American hop latent virus
Family Groups - The Baltimore Method

Carlaviruses
Viral plant pathogens and diseases
Hop diseases